The following is a timeline of the presidency of Joe Biden during the second quarter of 2021, from April 1 to June 30, 2021. To navigate between quarters, see timeline of the Joe Biden presidency.

Timeline

April 2021

May 2021

June 2021

See also
 First 100 days of Joe Biden's presidency
 List of executive actions by Joe Biden
 List of presidential trips made by Joe Biden (international trips)
 Timeline of the 2020 United States presidential election

References

2021 Q2
Presidency of Joe Biden
April 2021 events in the United States
May 2021 events in the United States
June 2021 events in the United States
Political timelines of the 2020s by year
Articles containing video clips